Knäred is a locality situated in Laholm Municipality, Halland County, Sweden with 1,088 inhabitants in 2010. The Treaty of Knäred was signed there in 1613, when the province of Halland was still part of Denmark.

References 

Populated places in Laholm Municipality